Yldiz Deborah Pollack-Beighle (born 21 April 1983) is a Surinamese politician who has served as Minister of Foreign Affairs from February 2017 to 16 July 2020.

Early life and education
Pollack-Beighle was born in Paramaribo on 21 April 1983. She has a master's degree in law from the Anton de Kom University of Suriname (2009) and a master's degree in public administration and governance from the FHR Lim a Po Institute for Social Studies (2012).

Career
Pollack-Beighle worked as a youth ambassador for Caribbean Community from 2005 and in 2008 was seconded by Suriname to the Secretariat in Guyana where she was a policy officer before becoming deputy program manager for youth development in 2013.

On 1 February 2017, Pollack-Beighle was appointed Minister of Foreign Affairs by President Dési Bouterse. She served until 16 July 2020.

Personal life
Pollack-Beighle is married to Jozef Pollack and has a daughter.

References

1983 births
Living people
People from Paramaribo
Anton de Kom University of Suriname alumni
Caribbean Community people
Women government ministers of Suriname
Foreign ministers of Suriname
Female foreign ministers
21st-century women politicians
Surinamese women diplomats
National Democratic Party (Suriname) politicians